There Goes My Heart is a 1938 romantic comedy film starring Virginia Bruce  and Fredric March, and directed by Norman Z. McLeod.  Bruce plays a wealthy heiress who goes to work under an alias at a department store owned by her grandfather, and March the reporter who tracks her down. The film is based on a story by Ed Sullivan, better known for his long-running Ed Sullivan Show. The film was nominated for a Best Score Oscar for Marvin Hatley.

Plot

Cast
 Fredric March as Bill Spencer
 Virginia Bruce as Joan Butterfield
 Patsy Kelly as Peggy O'Brien
 Alan Mowbray as Pennypepper E. Pennypepper
 Nancy Carroll as Dorothy Moore
 Eugene Pallette as Mr. Stevens
 Claude Gillingwater as Cyrus W. Butterfield
 Arthur Lake as Flash Fisher
 Harry Langdon as Preacher (uncredited)
 Etienne Girardot as Hinkley
 Robert Armstrong as Detective O'Brien
 Irving Bacon as Mr. Dobbs
 Irving Pichel as Mr. Gorman
 Syd Saylor as Robinson (as Sid Saylor)
 J. Farrell MacDonald as Police Officer
 Marjorie Main as Butterfield's customer (uncredited)

References

External links
 
 
 
 

1938 films
1938 romantic comedy films
American romantic comedy films
American black-and-white films
Films directed by Norman Z. McLeod
Films set in department stores
Films set in New York City
Hal Roach Studios
United Artists films
1930s English-language films
1930s American films